The 1931 Norwegian Football Cup was the 30th season of the Norwegian annual knockout football tournament. The tournament was open for all members of NFF, except those from Northern Norway. The final was played at Lovisenlund in Larvik on 18 October 1931, and was contested by ten-time former winners Odd and Mjøndalen, who also played in the final in 1924, which they lost. Odd won the final 4–2, and secured their eleventh title, which also was their last title in 69 years, before Odd again won the Norwegian Cup in 2000. Ørn were the defending champions, but were eliminated by Gjøa in the third round.

Rounds and dates
 First round: 9 August
 Second round: 16 August
 Third round: 30 August
 Fourth round: 13 September
 Quarter-finals: 20 September
 Semi-finals: 11 October
 Final: 18 October

First round 

|-
|colspan="3" style="background-color:#97DEFF"|Replay

|}

Second round 

|}

Third round 

|-
|colspan="3" style="background-color:#97DEFF"|Replay

|}

Fourth round

|-
|colspan="3" style="background-color:#97DEFF"|Replay

|}

Quarter-finals

|-
|colspan="3" style="background-color:#97DEFF"|Replay

|}

Semi-finals

|}

Final

See also
1931 in Norwegian football

References

Norwegian Football Cup seasons
Norway
Cup